The 2011 Luxembourgian communal elections were held on 9 October 2011.  Elections are held every six years across all of Luxembourg's communes.

Results

In the chart below, '-' represents that the party did not run in that commune, whereas '0' represents that the party did run, but won no council seats.  Results for communes using proportional representation only.  The party system does not apply in the majoritarian communes, making comparisons difficult.

For the first time, Betzdorf, Frisange, Lorentzweiler, Roeser, Sandweiler, and Remich had populations over 3,000 each, meaning that their elections were held by proportional representation.  Separate proportional elections were held in Bascharage and Clemency, despite Clemency not having the usual requisite population of 3,000, as the two are merging to form the new commune of Käerjeng on 1 January 2012.

Local elections in Luxembourg
2011 elections in Europe
2011 in Luxembourg
October 2011 events in Europe